Roleplay is the act of adopting roles.

Roleplay may also refer to:

 Role-playing game, a game in which players assume the roles of characters in a fictional setting
 Roleplay simulation, roleplay as a learning method
 Sexual roleplay, the act of acting out sexual scenarios
 Animal roleplay, play a non-human animal
 RolePlay (play), a 2001 Alan Ayckbourn play
 Inside Out (musical), an American musical previously titled Roleplay
 "Role Play", a song by The Original 7ven from Condensate
 Role Play, an upcoming American thriller film directed by Thomas Vincent
 Dimension (data warehouse)#Role-playing dimension, in data warehouses, the recycling of a dimension for multiple applications within the same database